The Broadway Stakes was an American Thoroughbred horse race held annually from 1897 thru 1910 at Gravesend Race Track in Gravesend, New York. A race for three-year-old horses of either sex, it was contested on dirt over a distance of a mile and one-sixteenth (8.5  furlongs).

Historical notes
An event that would become a popular race that regularly drew some of America's top three-year-olds, the inaugural running of Broadway Stakes took place on June 15, 1897. It was the feature race on that day's Card and carried a purse of $5,000. The event was won by The Friar, a colt owned by brothers Alfred and Dave Morris and trained by future Hall of Fame inductee Wyndham Walden.

Sly Fox won the 1898 race in what would be a very successful year in which he won eight stakes including the future Triple Crown race, the Preakness Stakes.  The 1901, 1902 and 1904 winners, The Parader and Old England and  Bryn Mawr, would also win the Preakness Stakes.

The 1899 race was won by Perry Belmont's Ethelbert who went on to a year of racing success that would earn him recognition as the American Champion Three-Year-Old Colt. The 1909 Broadway Stakes winner Fitz Herbert, owned and trained by Sam Hildreth, would also earn American Champion Three-Year-Old Colt honors.

Irish Lad, the American Champion Two-Year-Old Male Horse of 1902, won the 1903 edition of the Broadway Stakes.

In 1906 Ormondale set a new track record for the mile and one-sixteenth distance in winning the Broadway Stakes with a time of 1:45 3/5.

On June 3, 1910, Prince Imperial would win what would turn out to be the final running of Gravesend Race Track's Broadway Stakes.

Demise of a race and of a racetrack
The 1908 passage of the Hart–Agnew anti-betting legislation by the New York Legislature under Republican Governor Charles Evans Hughes led to a state-wide shutdown of racing in 1911 and 1912.  A February 21, 1913 ruling by the New York Supreme Court, Appellate Division saw horse racing return in 1913. However, it was too late for the Gravesend horse racing facility and it never reopened.

In 1923, Aqueduct Racetrack created a Broadway Stakes that was run at the same mile and one-sixteenth distance. It was limited to three-year-old females and non-gelded males and was run for ten years.

In 1980 Aqueduct Racetrack initiated another Broadway Stakes that is still being run into 2021. A sprint race at 6 furlongs, it is restricted to New York Bred fillies and mares age four and up.

Records
Speed record:
 1:45 3/5: Ormondale (1906)

Most wins by a jockey:
 2 - Guy Burns (1908, 1909)

Most wins by a trainer:
 2 - Thomas Welsh (1906, 1910)

Most wins by an owner:
 no owner won this race more than once

Winners

References

Flat horse races for three-year-olds
Open mile category horse races
Gravesend Race Track
Discontinued horse races in New York City
Recurring sporting events established in 1897
Recurring sporting events disestablished in 1911